This is a list of airports in Hawaii (a U.S. state), grouped by type and sorted by location. It contains all public-use and military airports in the state. Some private-use and former airports may be included where notable, such as airports that were previously public-use, those with commercial enplanements recorded by the FAA or airports assigned an IATA airport code.

Airports

Statistics

See also 
 Hawaii World War II Army Airfields
 Essential Air Service – Hawaii had three EAS subsidized airports until 2007
 List of airports by ICAO code: P#PH - Hawaii
 Wikipedia:WikiProject Aviation/Airline destination lists: North America#Hawaii

References 
Federal Aviation Administration (FAA):
 FAA Airport Data (Form 5010) from National Flight Data Center (NFDC), also available from AirportIQ 5010
 FAA Location Identifiers (Order 7350.7Z): Hawaii ICAO Identifiers (Section 6H), published March 15, 2007.
 National Plan of Integrated Airport Systems (2017–2021), released September 2016
 Passenger Boarding (Enplanement) Data for CY 2019 and 2020, updated November 8, 2021

Hawaii Department of Transportation:
 Airports Division

Other sites used as a reference when compiling and updating this list:
 Aviation Safety Network – used to check IATA airport codes
 Great Circle Mapper: Airports in Hawaii – used to check IATA and ICAO airport codes
 Abandoned & Little-Known Airfields: Hawaii – used for information on former airports

Airports
Lists of airports in the United States
Airports
Hawaii